Bratton is a surname. Notable people with the surname include: 

Benjamin Bratton, American fencer
Benjamin H. Bratton (born 1968), American sociologist
Brian Bratton (born 1982), Canadian football player
Chris Bratton (disambiguation), several people
Christopher Bratton, American educator and administrator
Creed Bratton (born 1943), American musician and actor
David Bratton (1869–1904), American water polo player and swimmer
Donald Bratton (born 1947), American politician
Elegance Bratton (born 1979), American filmmaker and photographer
Heather Bratton (1987–2006), American model
J. Rufus Bratton (1821–1897), American doctor, army surgeon, civic and Ku Klux Klan leader
John Bratton (1831–1898), American politician and general
John W. Bratton (1867–1947), American composer and theatrical producer
Johnny Bratton (1927–1993), American boxer
Joseph K. Bratton (1926–2007), American Army officer and nuclear engineer
Lisa Bratton (born 1996), American swimmer
Martha Bratton (c. 1749/50–1816), American patriot during the Revolutionary War
Mel Bratton (born 1965), American football player
Robert Bratton (disambiguation), several people
Rufus S. Bratton (1892–1958), American intelligence officer
Sam G. Bratton (1888–1963), American Senator and judge
Shawn Bratton, American Air Force officer
Theodore DuBose Bratton (1862–1944), American bishop
Ulysses Simpson Bratton (1868–1947), American lawyer and politician
Wilfred Bratton, Australian soccer player 
William Bratton (born 1947), American police officer

See also
Brattan